Eibach may refer to:


Places 

 Eibach (Nürnberg), a borough of Nuremberg
 Eibach (Dillenburg), a borough of Dillenburg

Rivers 

 Eibach (Bach), a stream located in the Swiss canton of Basel-Landschaft
 Eibach (Lungerersee), a stream located in the Swiss canton of Obwalden, see Lake Lungern

Buildings 

 Burg Eibach, the remains of an old water castle near Lindlar

Companies 

 Eibach, a German manufacturer of automotive coil springs (OEM and racing)